Born to Gamble (1935) is an American film directed by Phil Rosen and released by Republic Pictures.

Plot
Four brothers feel cursed by their family's gambling bug. All four try to overcome the addiction: only one, the youngest, is successful.

Cast
Onslow Stevens as Dan "Ace" Cartwright (prologue) & Henry Mathews
H.B. Warner as Carter Mathews
Maxine Doyle as Cora Strickland
Eric Linden as Earl Mathews
Lois Wilson as Paula Mathews
William Janney as Fred Mathews
Ben Alexander as Paul Mathews
Lucien Prival as Al Shultz

Critical reception
Allmovie noted "one of the more palatable efforts of M.H. Hoffman's poverty-row Liberty Films."

References

External links

1935 films
1935 romantic drama films
1935 adventure films
American black-and-white films
Films based on British novels
Films based on works by Edgar Wallace
Films about gambling
American romantic drama films
Films directed by Phil Rosen
1930s English-language films
1930s American films